Pterycombus is a genus of pomfret distinguished by greatly elongated dorsal and anal fins. Along with the genus Pteraclis, these fishes are commonly referred to as fanfishes. Pterycombus can be distinguished from Pteraclis by examining the dorsal and anal fin rays, which should be relatively uniform in thickness to neighboring rays and by a lack of scales anterior to the dorsal fin.

Species
Currently, there are two recognized species in this genus:
 Pterycombus brama, Atlantic fanfish (Fries, 1837) 
 Pterycombus petersii, prickly fanfish (Hilgendorf, 1878)

Species Distinction
Pterycombus brama can be distinguished from Pterycombus petersii by measuring the length of the longest dorsal and anal fin rays. In P. brama, the longest ray will be greater than half standard length, but will be less than half standard length in P. petersii. These two species can also be distinguished by geographic location. P. brama is generally distributed throughout the North and Central Atlantic Ocean, while P. petersii inhabits Pacific waters from Southern Africa to the Indo-Pacific. However, P. petersii has recently been found in the eastern North Pacific off the coast of Oregon, suggesting that it may have a greater distribution throughout Pacific waters.

References

Bramidae